Roland Wilson may refer to:

 Sir Roland Wilson (barrister) (1840–1919), British writer on law and India
 Roland Wilson (conductor), British cornet player and conductor based in Germany
 Sir Roland Wilson (economist) (1904–1996), Australian economist